Intal may refer to:

 Intal, a brand name for the pharmaceutical drug cromoglicic acid
 Intal language, an international auxiliary language
 JC Intal, Filipino professional basketball player